A lunule (from the Latin meaning small moon or crescent moon) is an anatomical feature which is found in the exterior surface of the shells of some species of clams, bivalve mollusks, as for example in the family Veneridae and in the genus Ascetoaxinus. 

The lunule is a well-defined area near the hinge line of the shell, anterior to the beaks. Despite the name, a lunule is not always in the shape of a crescent moon. Details of the lunule are sometimes an important diagnostic feature in identifying a bivalve shell.

References 

Bivalve anatomy
Mollusc shells